Kimmo Karhu is a Finnish former racing cyclist. He won the Finnish national road race title in 1989.

References

External links

Year of birth missing (living people)
Living people
Finnish male cyclists
Place of birth missing (living people)